Calytrix violacea is a species of flowering plant in the myrtle family, Myrtaceae and is endemic to the southwest of Western Australia. It is a shrub with linear to narrowly egg-shaped leaves with the narrower end towards the base, and purple, star-shaped flowers.

Description
The flowers are star-shaped and arranged in clusters of 5 to 25 on the ends of branches that continue to grow after flowering. Flowering mainly occurs in September and October.

Taxonomy
This species was first formally described in 1839 by John Lindley, who gave it the name Lhotskya violacea in his book A Sketch of the Vegetation of the Swan River Colony. In 1987, Lyndley Craven changed the name to Calytrix violacea in the journal Brunonia. The specific epithet (violacea) means "violet".

Distribution and habitat
Calytrix violacea grows in shrubland and woodland in sandy soil on plains and hills in the wheatbelt between Goomalling, Northam, Brookton and Quairading in the Avon Wheatbelt and Jarrah Forest bioregions of south-western Western Australia.

Conservation status
Calytrix violacea is listed as "not threatened" by the Western Australian Government Department of Biodiversity, Conservation and Attractions.

References

Plants described in 1839
violacea
Flora of Western Australia
Taxa named by John Lindley